Ado Maude (born 15 February 1967) is a Nigerian middle-distance runner. He competed in the men's 800 metres at the 1988 Summer Olympics.

References

1967 births
Living people
Athletes (track and field) at the 1988 Summer Olympics
Nigerian male middle-distance runners
Olympic athletes of Nigeria
Place of birth missing (living people)